Bear danger is the risk encountered by humans and their pets or livestock when interacting with bears.

Although most bears are apex predators in their own habitat, most do not, under normal circumstances, hunt and feed on humans. Most bear attacks occur when the animal is defending itself against anything it perceives as a threat to itself or its territory. For instance, bear sows can become extremely aggressive if they feel their cubs are threatened. Any solitary bear is also likely to become agitated if surprised or cornered, especially while eating.

Some species are more aggressive than others; sloth bears, Asiatic black bears, and brown bears are more likely to injure people than other species, and the American black bear is comparatively timid.

Separation is a key to conventional measures to minimize aggression and property damage by bears. Places such as Denali National Park in Alaska, U.S., emphasize proper techniques of food storage and garbage disposal, closures of park areas, training videos, and occasionally firearms on aggressive bears to prevent bears from claiming the lives of campers.

Dealing with bear encounters

The U.S. National Park service emphasizes keeping a distance from the bear and making noise to avoid startling a bear as the best ways to avoid a bear attack. If a bear does become confrontational, the usual advice is to stand one's ground and to not run or turn away from the bear, raise the arms above the head so as to appear larger, and to yell at the bear.

Running away or climbing a tree can activate the bear's hunting instincts and lead to it perceiving the human as prey. If a bear does charge, persons are advised to hold their ground, as most bear charges are bluffs. Finally, if a bear does attack, the usual advice is to curl into a fetal position so as to shield vital organs and appear non-threatening.

If this is not effective in stopping the attack, the only option left is to fight the bear in any way possible.

This advice applies to omnivores such as brown and black bears. The best way to avoid being attacked by the completely carnivorous polar bear is not to enter any area where polar bears live, or at least remain inside a hard-shell vehicle or building.

Food storage and garbage disposal

Bears are opportunistic omnivores with an excellent sense of smell, and are attracted to human and pet foods as well as refuse. Improper storage of these items can allow bears to eat human food and become dependent on it, increasing the probability of encounters with humans. Most brown and black bear encounters in human-populated areas involve so-called "trouble bears", usually young males who have just left their mothers and do not yet have a territory of their own. If they wander close to human settlements, the smells of cooking and garbage can cause them to ignore their usual instinct to avoid humans. Many parks and persons in areas with bears utilize bear-resistant garbage cans and dumpsters for this reason, and many areas have laws prohibiting the feeding of bears, even if  unintentional.

Campers can access bear-proof containers from many parks to store their food and trash. The containers are then buried or strung on a rope between two tall trees, out of a bear's reach.

Closure of park areas

After a bear has been identified by park rangers or campers, that area may be closed off to humans. Signs are then posted on the borders of the closed area to prevent unaware campers from entering. Warnings about being fined $500, imprisoned for six months, and the obvious risk of being mauled by a bear are added on in some places as extra deterrents for humans to stay away. Some campgrounds will temporarily suspend tent camping and only allow camping in hard-shell vehicles.

Firearms
When a bear becomes conditioned by human food or habituated to humans, and threatens or attacks humans, it becomes a threat. Authorities such as police, park rangers, etc. are concerned with their liability should an injury to a person occur. Due to this concern, they often trap and euthanize or kill animals that have injured or threatened people.

Many U.S. states with large bear populations, such as Alaska, have laws permitting the killing of bears if done in the defense of human life or property. The previously utilized technique of relocating bears often proved ineffective, as the bears generally would either find new sources of human food or simply return to their old territory. Bears have been known to wander into farms, cattle and sheep ranches, and other populated areas, especially if they are very hungry, such as when they have just awakened from hibernation, and these incidents often end with the bear being shot.

In Svalbard, which has an abundance of polar bears, any company outside of settlements is required to carry a rifle for self-defense.

Personal defense against bears can be difficult even with firearms, as bear fur and skin provide good resistance against small-caliber bullets. Large-caliber revolvers, chambered for .44 Magnum or even more powerful cartridges, are more effective, but not as effective as long guns sized in even a medium caliber (7mm class) or gauge (20ga) based on available energy and/or projectile weight; handguns are generally considered a minimum level of defense, not optimal.  Some handgun calibers such as .480 Ruger, .475 Linebaugh, .454 Casull, .460 S&W and .500 S&W better bridge the divide between long guns and handguns, but rifles and shotguns will always have the upper hand when utilized with the larger chamberings available for these options.

Bear spray

Bear spray, a form of pepper spray, is sometimes an effective defense against attacking bears.

See also
 Bear attacks
 List of fatal bear attacks in North America
 Bear cache

Specific incidents:
 Sloth bear of Mysore
 Sankebetsu brown bear incident
 Timothy Treadwell
 Binky (polar bear)

References

External links
Alaska department of Fish and Game video of a brown bear attempting to open a bear-resident garbage bin.

Bear attacks
Bears and humans